Taylor Iman Jones is an American actress and singer known for her work in musical theatre. 

Born in the San Francisco Bay Area of California, Jones moved to New York City and made her Broadway debut in 2017, in the ensemble of Groundhog Day. The following year, she originated the role of Mopsa in Head Over Heels on Broadway.

Jones has also performed off-Broadway—as Pat in Scotland, PA—and in national tours of American Idiot and Hamilton.

Theatre credits

References

External links 
 
 
 

Living people
American musical theatre actresses
Actresses from California
Singers from California
21st-century American women singers
21st-century American singers
Year of birth missing (living people)